Jovan Rašković (5 July 1929 – 28 July 1992) was a Croatian Serb psychiatrist, academic and politician.

Early life
Rašković was born in Knin in 1929. During World War II, after an Ustasha pogrom which resulted in the deaths of his relatives, he was exiled to Kistanje in Italian-occupied Dalmatia. He passed his secondary school exams in Šibenik, and graduated in Zagreb. He then studied electrical engineering and medicine at the University of Zagreb, where he obtained his diploma and a PhD from the university's medical school.

Career
In the 1960s, he served as director of Šibenik city hospital and later director of the medical center. He was one of the founders of the Medical Research Institute of Neurophysiology in Ljubljana. Rašković was a member of the Serbian Academy of Sciences and Arts, the Academy of Medical Sciences of Croatia and a number of psychiatry associations in the United States, Czechoslovakia and Italy. He was a university professor in Zagreb and Ljubljana and a visiting professor at the Universities of Pavia, Rome, Houston and London.

In February 1990, Rašković went into politics and founded and led the Serbian Democratic Party (SDS), which took part in the first Croatian democratic elections. He noticed that there was no equivalent party in Bosnia and Herzegovina so he contacted Radovan Karadžić, a colleague, to suggest for him to establish one.

Although the SDS won relatively few seats in the 1990 elections, it quickly began to increase its power, and Rašković was soon perceived as a leader of Serbs by Franjo Tuđman and his new government. That led to direct negotiations between the two about the future of Serbs in Croatia. During one meeting, Rašković remarked, "Serbs were crazy people". Tuđman's chief political advisor, Slaven Letica, had the words secretly taped and leaked the transcript to Croatian media to discredit Rašković among his people and then replace him with someone more acceptable to Croatian government. That backfired, as instead of rejecting Rašković, many Serbs lost any trust in Croatian government and embraced extremism and then armed conflict.

Later in 1990, Rašković was removed from power by "more radical, hard-line Serb nationalists", who went on to create the Republic of Serbian Krajina. Rašković retired from politics in 1991, after the Plitvice Lakes incident.

Death and legacy
Rašković died in Belgrade from a heart attack on 28 July 1992 at the age of 63. He is interred in the Alley of Distinguished Citizens in the Belgrade New Cemetery.

Streets in Trebinje, Prijedor, Banja Luka and Novi Banovci are named in his honor.

References

External links

 Serbian Academy of Sciences and Arts biography 

1929 births
1992 deaths
Members of the Serbian Academy of Sciences and Arts
People from Knin
Serbs of Croatia
Serb Democratic Party (Croatia) politicians
Serbian psychiatrists
Serbian anti-communists
Yugoslav politicians
Politicians of the Croatian War of Independence
School of Medicine, University of Zagreb alumni
Yugoslav physicians
Burials at Belgrade New Cemetery
Serbian nationalists